The Riverside Red Wave were a Minor League Baseball team in Riverside, California. The Red Wave were Class A-Advanced California League affiliate of the San Diego Padres. Plagued by poor attendance, the franchise moved to Adelanto following the 1990 season. The team would become the High Desert Mavericks.

History
In the fall of 1987, Bobby Brett and his brothers George, John, and Ken purchased their Salinas franchise for $250,000. The Brett ownership group signed a player development contract with the San Diego Padres. With two months until opening day the city approved a stadium lease with the club that included $1.5 million to upgrade the Riverside Sports Center. The team was headed to the inland empire where they hastily prepared for the season. Construction quickly ensued to bring the stadium capacity from 1,200 to 3,500. Clubhouses, offices, and concession facilities were added to the complex.
The Riverside Press-Enterprise newspaper ran a name the team contest. With over three thousand entries a new team name was selected, the Red Wave.

Despite a slow start the team finished the year 85-57 to claim the Southern division title. In the division round of the post season the Red Wave beat the Palm Springs Angels in five games to advance to the league championship. Riverside swept the Stockton Ports to win the California League 
Riverside may have won a league title on the field, but it finished last in attendance. The team was met with resistance in their efforts to sell beer at the games. At the time beer sales accounted for roughly fifteen percent of team's revenue. This would cost the Pilots over $80,000 over the course of their existence. Multiple attempts to obtain a license to sell beer were met with resistance. The club eventually conceded these efforts and accepted that attendance figures would fail to meet expectations.

The team's inaugural season proved to be their most successful. The Red Wave went an identical 64-78 in consecutive seasons, finishing in place last of the southern division. Following the conclusion of the 1990 season the club confirmed what had been long speculated, they would be relocating to a brand new ballpark in Adelanto. Upon moving the team adopted a unique moniker to represent the region, the High Desert Mavericks.

Ballpark
The Riverside Sports Center served as the Red Wave's primary ballpark. Now known as the Riverside Sports Complex, the facility is the home of UC Riverside baseball.

Season-by-season record

References

External links
 Stats Crew Riverside Red Wave

Defunct California League teams
San Diego Padres minor league affiliates
Professional baseball teams in California
Baseball teams established in 1988
Defunct baseball teams in California
Baseball teams disestablished in 1990